Darrell Mansfield is an American vocalist, harmonica player, songwriter, recording artist, and performer of various genres including gospel, contemporary Christian music, blues, blues rock, rock, country rock, and soul/R&B. He is considered a pioneer of the Jesus Music movement of the 1970s and has influenced countless contemporary Christian music and mainstream artists alike.

Biography
In 1974, Mansfield formed the Christian country rock band, Jubal, along with Don Gerber, Paul Angers, Steve Kara, and Henry Cutrona. After a name change from Jubal to Gentle Faith, the group released their self-titled album, Gentle Faith, in 1976.

In 1977, Mansfield formed the Darrell Mansfield Band. He has since recorded over 30 albums and toured throughout the United States, Europe, the Middle East, Asia, and Australia.

Mansfield has contributed vocals and harmonica to recordings by artists including Adam Again, Eddie Van Halen, Jon Bon Jovi, Loverboy, and Raphael Saadiq. He has also played alongside Billy Idol, Billy Sheehan, Earl Slick, Glenn Kaiser, Jimmy Hall, Joe Turner, Richie Sambora, Rick Derringer, Ted Nugent, and The Blind Boys of Alabama.

Mansfield was inducted into the Hohner Harmonica Hall of Fame in 1980  and is the "Ambassador to California" for the Blues Hall of Fame.

Mansfield is a vocal advocate for those facing mental health issues. Having struggled with depression throughout his life as a result of a chemical imbalance, Mansfield attempted suicide on numerous occasions, first in 1971, and later spent two years at Atascadero State Hospital in central California. He now incorporates the discussion of mental health in his music ministry.

Discography

 1976: Gentle Faith (with Gentle Faith)
 1979: Higher Power
 1980: Get Ready
 1983: Darrell Mansfield Live
 1983: The Vision
 1985: Revelation
 1988: Darrell Mansfield Band Live at Calvary Chapel
 1990: Trimmed and Burnin''' ‒ with Glenn Kaiser
 1991: Blues with a Feelin' ‒ with Eric Turner.
 1991: Live at Flevo 1992: Get Ready (re-release)
 1992: Give Him Your Blues 1993: Slow Burn ‒ with Glenn Kaiser
 1993: Shack of Peasants 1994: The Blues Night ‒ with Glenn Kaiser
 1994: Collection 1995: Mansfield and Company 1995: Tribute to Reverend Dan Smith: The Lord's House 1995: Into the Night ‒ with Larry Howard, Glenn Kaiser
 1997: Delta Blues 1997: Crossroads 1998: Last Chance Boogie 1999: Live in Europe 2000: Live on Tour 2000: Soul'd Out 2004: The Best of Darrell Mansfield Vol. 1 2007: Shades 2008: Born to be Wild 2009: Life's Highway 2009: The Best of Darrell Mansfield Vol. 2 2009: People Get Ready (live)
 2014: I Am Not AloneGuest appearances
 1975: Karen Lafferty ‒ Bird in a Golden Sky (Maranatha! Music)

Compilation albums
 1979: Hosanna USA Live (live) (Maranatha! Music)
 1992: Larry Howard's Cornerstone Blues Jam (Live) (Forefront Records) Tracks 4 & 5

Videography
 1998: First Love: A Historic Gathering Of Jesus Music Pioneers (live)
 2009: People Get Ready'' (live)

References

External links
 
 Hohner Harmonica's Darrell Mansfield Site
 Assistnews.net
 Darrell Mansfield discography at discogs.com

Living people
Gospel blues musicians
American blues singers
American blues harmonica players
American performers of Christian music
Year of birth missing (living people)